Bjuv is a locality and the seat of Bjuv Municipality, Skåne County, Sweden with 6,832 inhabitants in 2010.

References 

Findus was located in Bjuv before relocating to Germany and they make frozen food to stores worldwide

Populated places in Skåne County
Populated places in Bjuv Municipality
Municipal seats of Skåne County
Swedish municipal seats

fi:Bjuvin kunta